Don Albert Brown (August 20, 1937 – June 25, 2013) was an American football player. He played one season in the American Football League (AFL) in 1960. He was born in Dayton, Texas and attended Dayton High School where he played high school football from 1953 to 1955.  He then attended University of Houston where he played for the football team as a running back and defensive back from 1956 to 1958, earning an All-America honorable mention during his senior year.  He played for the College All-Stars in 1959 against the defending NFL champions, the Baltimore Colts.  In the game, he was involved in a serious collision with Bill Pellington which left him unconscious for several minutes.

He was drafted by the Los Angeles Rams with the 20th pick in the 1959 NFL draft but immediately traded for Ollie Matson of the Chicago Cardinals.  This trade was significant, as he was one of nine players traded for Matson.  After the Cardinals, he had a brief stint with the Green Bay Packers with under head coach Vince Lombardi before returning home to try out for the newly formed Houston Oilers, where he ended his professional career in 1961.

References

1937 births
2013 deaths
American football running backs
American football defensive backs
Chicago Cardinals players
Green Bay Packers players
Houston Cougars football players
Houston Oilers players
Players of American football from Texas
People from Dayton, Texas
American Football League players